Edmond Butler (1827–1895) was a U.S. Army officer and Medal of Honor recipient.

Edmond Butler may also refer to:

 Edmond Butler of Polestown (1595–1636), Member of Parliament for County Kilkenny, 1634–1635
 Edmond Butler, 3rd/13th Baron Dunboyne (1595–1640), Anglo-Irish nobleman
 Edmond Butler of Killoshulan (died 1691)

See also 
 Edmund Butler (disambiguation)